Arnim may refer to:

People
 Bettina von Arnim (1785-1859), born Elisabeth Catharina Ludovica Magdalena Brentano, German writer and novelist
 Ludwig Achim von Arnim (1781–1831), German poet and novelist
 Hans-Jürgen von Arnim (1889-1962), German general of the WWII
 Arnim (surname)

Other uses
 Arnim Zola, a fictional character in the Marvel Comics universe
 8055 Arnim
 Arnim family